Fire on Ice is a studio album from American musician Terry Callier. Released by Elektra Records in 1978, this is the artist's fifth album and the first with Elektra, released after a four-year break from recording. It has received mixed critical reception.

Critical reception
The editorial staff of AllMusic Guide gave the release three out of five stars, with Thom Jurek writing that the album is Callier's most confounding and "it's hard to know whom to blame for making a mess of what was arguably a solid album", noting that the shift to disco does not work for Callier and that some songs are overproduced but sums up that the release has its own "strangeness and charm". Writing for Pitchfork Media, Andy Beta scored this album and the subsequent Turn You to Love a 5.5. out of 10, writing that Fire on Ice "sputters on so many levels that it's hard to isolate just where things misfire".

Track listing
All songs written by Terry Callier, except where noted.
"Be a Believer"– 4:38
"Holdin' On (To Your Love)" (Callier, Larry Wade)– 4:08
"Street Fever" (Callier, Wade)– 3:42
"Butterfly"– 3:56
"I Been Doin' Alright Part II (Everything's Gonna Be Alright)"– 2:47
"Disco in the Sky" (Callier, Wade)– 4:16
"African Violet"– 7:13
"Love Two Love" (Wade)– 2:43
"Martin St. Martin" (Callier, Wade)– 5:34

Personnel
Terry Callier– guitar, vocals
Corinne Albright– baritone saxophone
Marilyn H. Baker– viola
Sidney Barnes– vocals
Jynean Bell– vocals
Dolores Bing– cello
Michael Boddicker– synthesizer
George Bohanon– trombone
Harry Brotman– engineering
Garnett Brown– trombone
Julianna Buffum– cello
Reginald "Sonny" Burke– keyboards
Ron Clark– violin
Jimmy Cleaveland– trombone
Scott Edwards– bass guitar
Richard Evans– arrangement, production, mixing
James Gadson– drums
Janice Gower– violin
Carmen Halsell– engineering
Eddie Harris– saxophone
William Henderson– violin
Paul Humphrey– drums
Fred Jackson, Jr.– tenor saxophone
Morris Jennings– percussion
Zollie Johnson– engineering 
Renita Koven– viola
Betty LaMagna– violin
Carl LaMagna– violin
Danny Leake– guitar
Mary Lundquist– violin
Kenny Mason– trumpet
Don Mizell– mixing, executive production
Charles Owens– saxophone
Barney Perkins– engineering
Derf Reklaw– percussion
Minnie Riperton– vocals
Scott Rowley– engineering 
Jackson Schwartz– engineering 
Paul Serrano– trumpet, engineering, mixing
Ross Traut– guitar
Phil Upchurch– guitar
Marcia Van Dyke– violin
Larry Wade– guitar
Cynthia White– vocals
Ellie Willis– vocals
Eugene Young– trumpet

References

External links

Entry at Rate Your Music

1978 albums
Disco albums by American artists
Elektra Records albums
Terry Callier albums
Chicago soul albums